Ski jumping has been featured as a sport in the Asian Winter Games since the fifth winter games in 2003. In 1996 Asian Winter Games, ski jumping was featured as demonstration sport.

Editions

Events

Medal table

Participating nations

List of medalists

References 
Sports123

 
Sports at the Asian Winter Games
Asian Winter Games
Nordic skiing at the Asian Winter Games